Clathromangelia variegata is a species of sea snail, a marine gastropod mollusk in the family Raphitomidae.

Description
The shell is very thin, with nine ribs and almost microscopic revolving lines. The color of the shell is yellowish or pinkish horn-color, with one or two narrow chestnut bands sometimes interrupted. The shell grows to a length of 8 mm.

Distribution
This species occurs in the Pacific Ocean off California, USA

References

External links
  Bouchet P., Kantor Yu.I., Sysoev A. & Puillandre N. (2011) A new operational classification of the Conoidea. Journal of Molluscan Studies 77: 273–308

variegata
Gastropods described in 1864